Kato Makrinou ( meaning "Lower Makrinou") is a village in the municipal unit of Makryneia, Aetolia-Acarnania, Greece. In 2011 its population was 580. It is located in a valley southeast of Lake Trichonida. It is 2 km northeast of Makrinou, 10 km southeast of Gavalou and 20 km northwest of Naupactus.

Population

External links
 Kato Makrinou on GTP Travel Pages

References

Populated places in Aetolia-Acarnania